The 1996–97 season was Kilmarnock's penultimate season in the Scottish Premier Division before the formation of the Scottish Premier League in 1998. Kilmarnock also competed in the Scottish Cup and the  League Cup.

Summary

Season
Kilmarnock finished seventh in the Scottish Premier Division with 39 points. They reached the second round of the League Cup, losing to rivals Ayr United, but went on to win the Scottish Cup, with a 1–0 victory over Falkirk.

Results and fixtures

Kilmarnock's score comes first

Scottish Premier Division

Scottish League Cup

Scottish Cup

Ayrshire Cup

Final league table

|}

Division summary

Transfers

Players in

Players out

References

External links
 Kilmarnock 1997–98 at Soccerbase.com (select relevant season from dropdown list)

Kilmarnock F.C. seasons
Kilmarnock